Assita Kanko (born 14 July 1980) is a Belgian journalist, human rights activist and politician who was elected as a Member of the European Parliament in 2019 representing the New Flemish Alliance.

Biography
Kanko was born in Godyr, Burkina Faso in 1980. She underwent female genital mutilation (FGM) as a child and has since campaigned for the practice to be banned. Kanko has also worked with the AHA Foundation founded by Ayaan Hirsi Ali to combat FGM, forced marriages and human rights abuses.

After the murder of the influential journalist Norbert Zongo, she studied journalism and became a human rights activist Kanko moved to the Netherlands in 2001 to study journalism and later settled in Brussels. She became a Belgian citizen in 2008.

Kanko was elected as a municipal counciller in Ixelles for the French speaking Mouvement Réformateur in 2012. In 2018, she joined the Dutch speaking New Flemish Alliance party, stating that she supported the policies of the N-VA's migration spokesman Theo Francken and that stronger policies were needed to tackle human trafficking and illegal immigration.

Kanko was elected to the European Parliament on the N-VA's list in 2019 and currently sits as a Vice-Chairwoman on the European Conservatives and Reformists group. In view of the apparent withdrawal of the United States from certain global political issues, she supports a more active role of the European Union and assumes that if not, China would attempt to fill the void. In her role as an MEP she has also advocated for issues facing the African continent and called for increased cooperation in coordinating medical provisions for African nations during the COVID-19 pandemic.

Kanko has described herself as a women's rights activist and founded an organisation called Polin to encourage equal opportunities and more female involvement in politics. She has spoken of the importance of defending European Enlightenment values, having responsible immigration policies and has argued for the stronger integration of immigrants into both European and Western society instead of pursuing multiculturalism.

In addition to her political work, Kanko has worked as a columnist for De Standaard.

References

External links 
Twitter

1980 births
Living people
MEPs for Belgium 2019–2024
21st-century women MEPs for Belgium
New Flemish Alliance MEPs
Belgian people of Burkinabé descent
Belgian journalists
Belgian women journalists
Belgian human rights activists
Belgian women's rights activists
Activists against female genital mutilation
Victims of human rights abuses
American Enterprise Institute
Critics of multiculturalism
Violence against women in Burkina Faso